The 1990 Michigan Wolverines football team represented the University of Michigan in the 1990 NCAA Division I-A football season.  The team's head coach was Gary Moeller.  The Wolverines played their home games at Michigan Stadium.  The team won the third of five consecutive Big Ten championships. They were co-champions with Michigan State, Iowa and Illinois.

Schedule

Personnel

Season summary

at Notre Dame

Michigan was ranked #4 and played #1 ranked Notre Dame in South Bend. The Wolverines fell behind 14-3 after one quarter, then rallied to take a 24-14 lead after three quarters on an Allen Jefferson 1 yard run and Desmond Howard's two TD catches from Elvis Grbac. The Fighting Irish rallied in the 4th quarter, cutting the lead to 24-21 on a Rodney Culver 1 yard run, then scored the game winner with 1:40 left in the game on a Rick Mirer 18 yard TD pass to Adrian Jarrell. After a Notre Dame interception of Grbac on the first play after the touchdown, the Wolverine defense forced a three and out and regained possession with 15 seconds left. Grbac threw two incompletions and the Fighting Irish held on for the 28-24 victory. Jon Vaughn ran for 201 yards and Howard caught 6 passes for 133 yards for Michigan.

UCLA

Jon Vaughn ran for 288 yards and three touchdowns as #7 ranked Michigan routed the UCLA Bruins, 38-15, at Michigan Stadium. The Wolverines totaled 456 yards on the ground while holding UCLA to 44 yards rushing. The Bruins did dent the Wolverine defense for 353 yards passing. Of Vaughn's three scores, one was a 63 yard burst to seal the victory for Michigan. Allen Jefferson and Burnie Legette each ran for a touchdown for the Wolverines. Erick Anderson and Lance Dottin each had interceptions for the defense.

Maryland
Martin Davis returned an interception 27 yards for a touchdown and Michigan never looked back as they beat the Terrapins 45-17 at Michigan Stadium. Vada Murray and Lance Dottin each had interceptions and the defense held Maryland to 93 yards rushing. Jon Vaughn ran for two touchdowns, while Desmond Howard, Kevin Owen and Jarrod Bunch each caught touchdown passes. Michigan had 352 yards of total offense.

at Wisconsin

Desmond Howard caught two touchdown passes from Elvis Grbac as the Wolverines opened up a 17-0 halftime lead. Grbac threw an 8 yard TD pass to Derrick Walker and Ricky Powers and Jon Vaughn ran for touchdowns as Michigan routed Wisconsin 41-3 at Camp Randall Stadium. The Badgers kicked a 33 yard field goal with over 4 minutes left to avoid the shutout. The Wolverines rolled up 534 yards of total offense, while holding Wisconsin to 189 yards.

Michigan State
Michigan came into the game ranked #1 in the country. With six seconds left, Elvis Grbac threw a touchdown pass to Derrick Alexander to make it 28–27 Michigan State. Michigan coach Gary Moeller elected to go for a two point conversion for the win. Grbac threw an incomplete pass to Desmond Howard, but the play was controversial since a Spartan defender appeared to have interfered with Howard. A columnist in The Detroit News wrote: "Michigan State cornerback Eddie Brown had tripped him. No discussion. No debate. It was a clear and obvious foul that a million and one eyes in the stands and on national television could see, but somehow not one single referee in this joint managed to catch a glimpse of." The Wolverines then attempted an onside kick, which they recovered. Grbac scrambled and threw a Hail Mary that was tipped and intercepted to end the game.

Iowa

Sources: Box Score

Michigan took a 20-10 lead into the 4th quarter, but the Hawkeyes rallied with 14 fourth-quarter points to upset the Wolverines, 24-23 at Michigan Stadium. Dave Ritter blocked an Iowa punt and Dwayne Ware returned it 7 yards for a touchdown for the Wolverines. The 2 point conversion failed. Matt Rodgers sneaked in from 1 yard out for the Hawkeyes and on the ensuing possession, the Hawkeyes drove down the field and Paul Kujawa ran in from 1 yard out with 1:09 left in the game to hand Michigan its first Homecoming loss since 1967.

Indiana
Michigan raced to a 31–7 halftime lead on the way to a 45–19 victory over Indiana. The Wolverines ran for 295 yards and Jon Vaughn, Jarrod Bunch and Ricky Powers each ran for a touchdown. Elvis Grbac passed for 166 yards and threw 3 touchdown passes, one each to Desmond Howard, Derrick Alexander and Dave Diebolt. Lance Dottin, Dwayne Ware and Tripp Welborne each had an interception.

Purdue

    
    
    
    
    
    
    
    

Michigan fell behind 6-0 midway through the first quarter, then ripped off 31 straight points to take a 31-6 lead into halftime behind Allen Jefferson's two touchdown runs and Dwayne Ware's 17 yard return of a blocked punt. Jefferson added a 1 yard run in the 4th quarter as Michigan left West Lafayette with a 38-13 victory. Jon Vaughn led the Wolverines with 131 yards rushing and Elvis Grbac passed for 160 yards.

Illinois
John Carlson kicked five field goals to lead the Wolverines to a 22-17 victory over Illinois. Ricky Powers ran for 113 yards and a touchdown as the Wolverines rushed for 303 yards. Elvis Grbac completed 10 of 18 passed for 129 yards. Vada Murray had an interception for the defense.

Minnesota

    
    
    
    
    
    
    
    

Michigan trailed 10-7 at halftime, but rallied in the 2nd half with 28 points on the way to a 35-18 victory over the Golden Gophers at the HHH Metrodome. Ricky Powers ran for 127 yards and a touchdown while Elvis Grbac threw for 126 yards and three touchdown passes. Grbac's TD throws went to Desmond Howard, Derrick Alexander and Jarrod Bunch. Howard had 8 catches for 86 yards. Lance Dottin and Neil Simpson had interceptions for the Wolverine defense.

Ohio State

    
    
    
    
    
    
    

J.D. Carlson kicked a 37 yard field goal as time expired to give Michigan a 16-13 win. In the third quarter, things weren't going all that well for the Wolverines. Greg Frey completed a 12 yard touchdown pass to Jeff Graham and Ohio State took a seven-point lead. Momentum changed quickly when Derrick Alexander took the ensuing kickoff back inside the Ohio State 40 yard line. Then Elvis Grbac found Desmond Howard on a 12 yard post pattern to tie the score, and it remained tied well into the fourth quarter. Late in the fourth quarter, Ohio State went for it on fourth and less than a yard to go from the Ohio State 30. On fourth down, the Wolverines stuffed Frey at the 29, and took possession there. Michigan moved the ball carefully, methodically, and with time for one final play, a field goal attempt.

Gator Bowl
After both teams exchanged early turnovers, Michigan opened the scoring when Elvis Grbac threw deep down the right side of the field to Desmond Howard, for a career-long 63-yard touchdown reception. J.D. Carlson's extra point gave Michigan a 7-0 lead with 1:04 left in the first quarter. Mississippi scored its only points of the game in the second quarter when Brian Lee kicked a career-long and Gator Bowl record 51-yard field goal to trim the margin to 7-3. Following a 32 yard Howard return of the ensuing kickoff, Jon Vaughn sprinted around left end for a gain of 37 yards and a first down at the Rebel 31. Five plays later, Grbac threw seven yards to Jarrod Bunch for a 14-3 halftime lead. Grbac's touchdown pass, his 19th of the season, broke Jim Harbaugh's Michigan single-season record for touchdown passes thrown (18 in 1985). Early in the third quarter, Grbac threw a screen pass to Howard who eluded the Mississippi defense en route to a 50-yard touchdown reception and a 21-3 Michigan lead with 10:53 left in the third quarter. Later in the quarter, Ole Miss quarterback Tom Luke was intercepted by Todd Plate at the Michigan 37. After a three-yard Ricky Powers run and an 11-yard Grbac-to-Howard completion, the Wolverines had a first down on the Ole Miss 49 yard line. On the next play, Powers blasted up the middle for a gain of 44 yards and a first down at the Rebel five. Bunch pounded into the end zone on the next play, giving Michigan a comfortable 28-3 lead. As the third stanza was nearing completion, Grbac connected with Derrick Alexander over the middle for a 33-yard touchdown--Grbac's fourth of the game, and a Michigan single bowl record. That closed the scoring, giving Michigan a resounding 35-3 win. Offensive linemen Dean Dingman, Tom Dohring, Greg Skrepenak, Matt Elliott and Steve Everitt were named the game's Most Valuable Players for leading the offense to a Michigan single-game record 715 total yards.

Statistical achievements
Desmond Howard was the Big Ten receiving statistical champion for conference games with 5.5 receptions per contest, Northwestern's Richard Buchanan won the title for all games. Additionally, he won the first of two Big Ten receiving yardage champion for all games with 85.4 yards per game, but he lost the conference games yardage championship to Ohio State's Jeff Graham. J.D. Carlson won the Big Ten scoring championship with a 7.9 points per game average for all games, although he lost the conference per game championship to Michigan State's Hyland Hickson. Elvis Grbac won his first of three consecutive Big Ten passing statistical championships (137.1 passing efficiency in all games), Matt Rodgers of Iowa won the title for conference games.

The team led the Big Ten in rushing offense for all games (264.6 yards per game), although Michigan State won the title for conference games. They also led in passing efficiency for all games (137.7) although Iowa led for conference games. They were the conference leader in total offense for all games (432.5 yards per game), although Iowa won the title for conference games. The 715 yards of total offense in the January 1, 1991 Gator Bowl against Ole Miss stood as the school record until October 17, 2009.

The team earned the first of four consecutive and six 1990s Big Ten rushing defense statistical championships for all games by holding opponents to 104.7 yards per game. Iowa won the title for conference games. The team led the conference in total defense for conference games (289.4), while Iowa led for all games. The team led the Big Ten Conference in scoring defense for conference games (16.9 points per game) and all games (16.5). They were the conference leaders in quarterback sacks for conference games (3.6 sacks per game) and all games (3.6 sacks per game). They led the conference in turnover margin (+0.92) in all games, while Illinois led for conference games. They led the conference in punt return average in conference games (17.4 yards per return) and all games (15.2). The season marked the third consecutive year that the team led the conference in kick return average in conference games (26.5 yards per return) and all games (27.3).

Jon Vaughn set the current school record for career yards per carry (6.29, min 200 carries), eclipsing Rob Lytle's 16-year-old record. Vaughn opened the 1990 season by posting 201 rushing yards on September 15, 1990, against University of Notre Dame Fighting Irish and following it up with 288 rushing yards against the University of California, Los Angeles Bruins on September 22, 1990, at the Big House. This feat made him the first Michigan back to rush for 200 yards in consecutive games, a feat not duplicated until Mike Hart did so in 2004. Grbac became the fourth Wolverine to post a 4-touchdown pass performance against Mississippi State, he would become the first to post two the following season and later in his career would post a third such performance. Grbac became the first single-season 20-touchdown passer with 21, eclipsing Jim Harbaugh's 18 in 1985, a record he would extend to 25 the following year.

Awards and honors
The individuals in the sections below earned recognition for meritorious performances.

National
All-Americans: Tripp Welborne, Dean Dingman, Greg Skrepenak

Conference

All-Conference: J.D. Carlson, Dean Dingman, Tripp Welborne, Jon Vaughn, Greg Skrepenak, Desmond Howard, Tom Dohring, Erick Anderson
Big Ten Co-Offensive Player of the Year: Vaughn (coaches)

Team
Most Valuable Player: Tripp Welborne
Frederick Matthei Award: Erick Anderson
Arthur Robinsion Scholarship Award: David Ritter
Dick Katcher Award: T.J. Osman
Hugh Rader Jr. Award: Dean Dingman
Robert P. Ufer Award: John Milligan

References

External links
  1990 Football Team -- Bentley Historical Library, University of Michigan Athletics History

Michigan
Michigan Wolverines football seasons
Big Ten Conference football champion seasons
Gator Bowl champion seasons
Michigan Wolverines football